Ibtin is a Bedouin village in northern Israel. Located in the Lower Galilee around half a kilometre from Kfar Hasidim, it falls under the jurisdiction of Zevulun Regional Council.

History
The village was established in 1965 as part of a plan to settle the Bedouin in the area in permanent settlements. Residents of the village are members of the Amria tribe.

The sacred tree of U'm Ayash is located in the village, which according to legend, has stones roll under it every Friday.

References

Bibliography

External links
 Welcome To Ibtin
Survey of Western Palestine Map 5:     IAA, Wikimedia commons

Arab villages in Israel
Populated places established in 1965
Populated places in Haifa District
1965 establishments in Israel